Marsabit is a 6300 km basaltic shield volcano in Kenya, located 170 km east of the center of the East African Rift, in Marsabit County near the town of Marsabit. This was primarily built during the Miocene, but some lava flows and explosive maar-forming eruptions have occurred more recently. At least two of the maars host crater lakes.

The volcano is covered by dense forest. Marsabit National Park is in the area.

It was here, near a body of water they dubbed Lake Paradise, that American explorers Martin and Osa Johnson spent time in the 1920s living and making wildlife documentaries.

See also
 List of volcanoes in Kenya

References

External links 
 https://web.archive.org/web/20051224155242/http://www.kenyaforests.org/reports/Marsabitstatus.pdf

 
Eastern Province (Kenya)
Volcanoes of Kenya
Maars
Mountains of Kenya
Volcanic crater lakes
Pliocene shield volcanoes
Pleistocene shield volcanoes